Tarjei is a Norwegian given name. It is a variant of Torgeir, which is derived from the Old Norse þórgeirr, meaning "Thor's spear". Notable people with the name include:

 Tarjei Bø (born 1988), Norwegian biathlete
 Tarjei Dale (born 1983), Norwegian footballer
 Tarjei Sandvik Moe (born 1999), Norwegian actor
 Tarjei Aase Omenås (born 1992), Norwegian footballer
 Tarjei Kirkesæther (born 1982), Norwegian footballer
 Tarjei Rygnestad (1954–2013), Norwegian physician
 Tarjei Skarlund (born 1978), Norwegian volleyball player
 Tarjei Strøm (born 1978), Norwegian drummer
 Tarjei Vesaas (1897–1970), Norwegian poet and novelist

Norwegian masculine given names